Enoch Roberts House, also known as the Trainer Mansion, is a historic home located at Quakertown, Bucks County, Pennsylvania. It was built about 1814, and is a -story, five bay, plastered fieldstone dwelling in a vernacular Georgian style.  It has an original stone rear kitchen ell.  It has a gable roof with dormers added in the 1830s and a semi-circular entrance portico added in the 1940s.

It was added to the National Register of Historic Places in 1986.

References

Houses on the National Register of Historic Places in Pennsylvania
Houses completed in 1814
Houses in Bucks County, Pennsylvania
National Register of Historic Places in Bucks County, Pennsylvania